Zen: The Music of Fred Katz is the debut album by cellist and composer Fred Katz released on the Pacific Jazz label.

Reception

The Allmusic site rated the album 3 stars and stated: "Some of the music is overly precious and a bit fragile, but there are some swinging moments, making this a worthwhile (if difficult-to-find) Third Stream effort".

Track listing
All compositions by Fred Katz
 "Lord Randall" - 7:32
 "Suite for Horn:" - 13:34
 "Allegro" 
 "Zen"
 "Science Fiction"
 "Pluck It" - 2:58
 "Classical Katz" - 2:59
 "Loma" - 3:27
 "Granada" - 3:54
 "Katz-Up" - 3:51
 "Montuna" - 4:27

Personnel
Fred Katz - cello 
Paul Horn - tenor saxophone, alto saxophone, flute, clarinet
John Pisano - guitar (tracks 1-3 & 5-8)
Carson Smith - bass (tracks 1-3 & 5-8)
Chico Hamilton - drums (tracks 1-3 & 5-8)
Dick Noel, Joe Howard, Herbie Harper - trombone (track 2)
Harry Klee - flute (track 2)
Willy Schwartz - clarinet (track 2)
Julie Jacobs - oboe (track 2)
Marty Berman - bassoon (track 2)

References

Pacific Jazz Records albums
Fred Katz (cellist) albums
1957 debut albums